Dean William Bell (born 3 May 1992) is an English cricketer.  Bell is a right-handed batsman who fields as a wicket-keeper.  He was born in Blackpool, Lancashire and educated at Sedbergh School.

Bell made his first-class debut for Cambridge MCCU against Essex in 2011.  He made two further first-class matches that season, against Middlesex and Surrey.

He is now bossing it for Horwich RMI CC.

References

External links
Dean Bell at ESPNcricinfo
Dean Bell at CricketArchive

1992 births
Living people
Sportspeople from Blackpool
English cricketers
People educated at Sedbergh School
Cricketers from Yorkshire
Cambridge MCCU cricketers
Wicket-keepers